Larry James Taylor Junior, also commonly known simply as Larry in Brazil (born October 3, 1980), is an American-Brazilian professional basketball player. At a height of 1.82 m (5 ft 11.5 in) tall, he can play either the point guard or shooting guard position, with point guard being his main position. He also represented the senior Brazilian national basketball team. While he was a player of Bauru, he received the nickname "Alienígena" (English: Alien), because of his skills with the basketball.

Professional career
Taylor first came to Brazil in 2008, to play with Bauru Basket. On the São Paulo State's team, he became one of the most important players in Brazil, helping the team to win major trophies like the FIBA Americas League (Latin America's version of the EuroLeague) and to reach the top-tier level Brazilian League's (NBB) finals, becoming a local idol. He also competed at the 2015 FIBA Intercontinental Cup with Bauru, where they lost in the finals to the at the time defending EuroLeague champions Real Madrid.

After 7 years with Bauru, Taylor joined Mogi das Cruzes of the top-tier Brazilian League. In his first game back with Bauru, his former team retired his number 4 jersey.

Eventually, Taylor would return to Bauru after three years away playing for Mogi das Cruzes.

National team career
In 2012, Taylor received Brazilian nationality, and thus became able to represent the senior Brazilian national basketball team at major tournaments. Taylor went on to play with Brazil at the 2012 Summer Olympics, the 2013 FIBA AmeriCup, and the 2014 FIBA World Cup. In 2015, he won the gold medal at the 2015 Pan American Games, in Toronto.

He was ultimately left out of the final roster list of Brazil's national team for the 2016 Summer Olympics, in Rio de Janeiro.

Career statistics

NBB

Regular season

Playoffs

Personal
Taylor is married to Erika Nicole Taylor, a Kansas City, Missouri activist and philanthropist. He is friends with Dwyane Wade and his brother since young.

He became a naturalized Brazilian citizen in 2012 in order to play for Brazil at the 2012 Summer Olympics.
In Brazil Taylor have started his rapper career.

Taylor is a supporter of Corinthians in Brazil and usually choose this team to play FIFA.

References

External links
 FIBA.com Profile
 Latinbasket.com Profile
 RealGM.com Profile
 NBB Profile 
 Bauru Basket Profile 

1980 births
Living people
2014 FIBA Basketball World Cup players
American expatriate basketball people in Brazil
American expatriate basketball people in Mexico
American expatriate basketball people in Venezuela
American men's basketball players
Associação Bauru Basketball players
Brazilian men's basketball players
Basketball players at the 2012 Summer Olympics
Basketball players at the 2015 Pan American Games
Basketball players from Chicago
Brazilian people of African-American descent
Frayles de Guasave players
Guaiqueríes de Margarita players
Junior college men's basketball players in the United States
Lobos Grises UAD players
Missouri Western Griffons men's basketball players
Mogi das Cruzes Basquete players
Naturalized citizens of Brazil
Novo Basquete Brasil players
Olympic basketball players of Brazil
Pan American Games gold medalists for Brazil
Pan American Games medalists in basketball
Point guards
Shooting guards
South Suburban College alumni
Medalists at the 2015 Pan American Games
Venados de Mazatlán (basketball) players